Rhombosolea is a genus of righteye flounders. The four species in this genus can be found in the waters around New Zealand and southern Australia.

Species
There are currently four recognized species in this genus:
 Rhombosolea leporina Günther, 1862 (Yellowbelly flounder)
 Rhombosolea plebeia (Richardson, 1843) (Sand flounder)
 Rhombosolea retiaria Hutton, 1874 (Black flounder)
 Rhombosolea tapirina Günther, 1862 (Greenback flounder)

References 

 
Marine fish genera
Taxa named by Albert Günther
Marine fish of New Zealand